Ernest Frederick "Fritz" Hollings (January 1, 1922April 6, 2019) was an American politician who served as a United States senator from South Carolina from 1966 to 2005. A conservative Democrat, he was also the 106th governor of South Carolina, the 77th lieutenant governor of South Carolina, and a member of the South Carolina House of Representatives. He served alongside Democrat turned Republican Senator Strom Thurmond for 36 years, making them the longest-serving Senate duo in history. At the time of his death, he was the oldest living former U.S. senator.

Born in Charleston, South Carolina, Hollings graduated from The Citadel in 1942 and joined a law practice in Charleston after attending the University of South Carolina School of Law. During World War II, he served as an artillery officer in campaigns in North Africa and Europe. After the war, Hollings successively won election to the South Carolina House of Representatives, as lieutenant governor, and as governor. He sought election to the Senate in 1962 but was defeated by incumbent Olin D. Johnston.

Johnston died in 1965, and the following year Hollings won a special election to serve the remainder of Johnston's term. Hollings remained popular and continually won re-election, becoming one of the longest-serving Senators in U.S. history. Hollings sought the Democratic nomination in the 1984 presidential election but dropped out of the race after the New Hampshire primary. He declined to seek re-election in 2004 and was succeeded by Republican Jim DeMint.

Early life

Hollings was born in Charleston, South Carolina, the son of Wilhelmine Dorothea Meyer (1888–1982) and Adolph Gevert Hollings, Sr. (1882–1940). He was of German descent. Hollings was raised at 338 President St. in the Hampton Park Terrace neighborhood from age 10 until he enrolled in college.

Education and personal life

Hollings graduated from The Citadel in 1942, receiving a Bachelor of Arts degree. He achieved an LL.B. in 1947 after 21 months at the University of South Carolina, and joined a law practice in Charleston. Hollings was a member of the Pi Kappa Phi fraternity.

He was married to Rita Liddy "Peatsy" Hollings from August 21, 1971, until her death in October 2012. He had four children (Michael, Helen, Patricia Salley, and Ernest III) with his first wife, Martha Patricia Salley Hollings, whom he married on March 30, 1946. He was a Lutheran. In addition, Fritz and Patricia had two sons who died.

He served as an officer in the U.S. Army's 353rd and 457th Artillery units from 1942 to 1945, during World War II, and was awarded the Bronze Star for meritorious service in direct support of combat operations from December 13, 1944, to May 1, 1945, in France and Germany. He received the European-African-Middle Eastern Campaign Medal with five Bronze Service Stars for participation in the Tunisia, Southern France, Rome-Arno, and Central Europe Campaigns.

Political career

He served three terms in the South Carolina House of Representatives from 1949 to 1954. After only one term, Hollings's colleagues elected him Speaker Pro Tempore in 1951 and 1953. He was subsequently elected Lieutenant Governor of South Carolina in 1954, and Governor in 1958 at the age of 36.

Governor of South Carolina

As governor of South Carolina from January 20, 1959, to January 15, 1963, Hollings worked to improve the state's educational system, helping to bring more industry and employment opportunities to the state. His term in office saw the establishment of the state's technical education system and its educational television network. He also called for and achieved significant increases in teachers' salaries, bringing them closer to the regional average. At the 1961 Governor's Conference on Business, Industry, Education and Agriculture in Columbia, South Carolina, he declared, "Today, in our complex society, education is the cornerstone upon which economic development must be builtand prosperity assured."

During Hollings's term as governor, the Confederate battle flag was flown above the South Carolina State House underneath the U.S. and state flags. The battle flag was placed over the dome in 1962 by a concurrent resolution of the state legislature during the commemoration of the Civil War centennial. The resolution failed to designate a time for its removal. In 2000 the state legislature voted to move the flag from above the state house to a Confederate soldiers' monument in front of the building, where it remained until 2015, when Republican governor Nikki Haley ordered it removed following the murders of nine black churchgoers by a Confederate sympathizer in the state earlier that year.

In his last address to the General Assembly on January 9, 1963, ahead of the peaceful admission to Clemson University of its first black student, Harvey Gantt, Hollings declared: "As we meet, South Carolina is running out of courts... this General Assembly must make clear South Carolina's choice, a government of laws rather than a government of men... This should be done with dignity. It should be done with law and order."

Hollings oversaw the last executions in South Carolina before the U.S. Supreme Court's decision in Furman v. Georgia, which temporarily banned capital punishment. During his term, eight inmates were put to death by electric chair. The last was rapist Douglas Thorne, on April 20, 1962.

He sought the Democratic nomination for a seat in the U.S. Senate in 1962 but lost to incumbent Olin D. Johnston.

United States Senator

Early Senate career

Johnston died on April 18, 1965. Hollings's successor as governor, Donald S. Russell, resigned in order to accept appointment to the Senate seat. In the summer of 1966, Hollings defeated Russell in the Democratic primary for the remaining two years of the term. He then narrowly won the special election on November 8, 1966, against the Democrat-turned-Republican Marshall Parker, and was sworn in shortly thereafter. He gained seniority on other newly elected U.S. senators who would have to wait until January 1967 to take the oath of office. In 1967, he was one of eleven senators who voted against the nomination of Thurgood Marshall to become the first black justice on the U.S. Supreme Court. The following year, Hollings won the Senate seat for his first full term when he again defeated Marshall Parker but in this instance by a much wider margin.

For thirty-six years (until January 2003), he served alongside Republican Strom Thurmond, making them the longest-serving Senate duo in the history of the United States to date. This also made Hollings the longest-serving junior senator, even though he had more seniority than all but a few of his colleagues. Thurmond and Hollings generally had a good relationship despite their sometimes sharp philosophical differences, and frequently collaborated on legislation and projects to benefit South Carolina. Their combined seniority gave South Carolina clout in national politics well beyond its relatively small population. Only Thurmond, Robert Byrd, Ted Kennedy, Daniel Inouye, Carl Hayden, John Stennis, Ted Stevens, Pat Leahy, Orrin Hatch, Chuck Grassley, and Thad Cochran have served longer in the Senate than did Hollings.

In 1970, Hollings authored The Case Against Hunger: A Demand for a National Policy, acknowledging the Reverend I.D. Newman and Sister Mary Anthony for opening his eyes to the despair caused by hunger and helping him realize that he must do something about it. Hollings made headlines the year before when he toured poverty-stricken areas of South Carolina, often referred to as his "Hunger Tours". He was accused of drawing unwanted attention to South Carolina while other states, both northern and southern, also faced extreme poverty. Hollings knew South Carolina was not alone in its struggle and thought that if any politician was going to investigate hunger in South Carolina, it was going to at least be a South Carolinian. After a tour of an East Charleston slum, he said, "I don't want Romney and Kennedy coming here to look at my slums. As a matter of fact when I get caught up with my work, I think I may go look at the slums of Boston." For his efforts, Hollings was also accused of "scheming for the Negro vote". Hollings, who had seen plenty of white hunger and poverty and slums on his tours, responded, "You just don't make political points on hunger. The poor aren't registered to vote and they won't vote." In February 1969, however, Hollings testified as to what he had seen on his fact-finding tours in front of the Senate Select Committee on Hunger and Human Needs. Charleston's News and Courier (now The Post and Courier) reported that "Senators, members of the press corps and visitors packed in the hearing room watched and listened in disbelief as Hollings detailed dozens of tragically poignant scenes of human suffering in his state." Hollings recommended to the committee that free food stamps be distributed to the most needy, and just over a day later, Senator George McGovern announced that free food stamps would be distributed in South Carolina as part of a national pilot program for feeding the hungry.

Hollings and his first wife separated in 1970 and divorced in 1971. Their children lived with their mother, and Hollings never discussed the reason for the divorce. Later that year, he married Rita Liddy "Peatsy" Hollings (born 1935), who was 13 years his junior. She had joined his administrative staff in 1967. It was her first and his second marriage. They were married 41 years until her death in 2012.

In the 1970s, Hollings joined with fellow senators Kennedy and Henry M. Jackson in a press conference to oppose President Gerald Ford's request that Congress end Richard Nixon's price controls on domestic oil, which had helped to cause the gasoline lines during the 1973 Oil Crisis. Hollings said he believed ending the price controls (as was eventually done in 1981) would be a "catastrophe" that would cause "economic chaos".

In February 1970, during a session of debate on federal aid to school districts serving children living in public housing units, Hollings asked New York Senator Jacob K. Javits if he would support the anti-busing amendment given that it was based on New York law.

In September 1970, during a speech at the University of Georgia in Athens, Hollings declared that the United States could not afford such "leadership by political bamboozle", calling on Americans to ignore the voices of discord and unite for "meaningful changes" in society. Hollings said President Nixon had led the U.S. down a "clamorous road of drift and division" and criticized the "ranting rhetoric" of Vice President Spiro Agnew. Hollings attributed the principal blame for the disunity of the U.S. on special interest groups and "impatient minority blocs" that had shouted "non negotiable demands". Hollings linked former President Johnson and President Nixon with having both "attacked the politics of the problem rather than the problems themselves".

In February 1971, Hollings introduced Ted Kennedy in Charleston, South Carolina, ahead of his remarks calling for an end to the Vietnam War. Hollings disclosed that Kennedy had sought his advice on how to answer reporters' questions regarding a possible presidential campaign and that Kennedy believed his visit would spark speculation on the part of reporters about a campaign regardless of what he said.

In November 1971, Hollings announced his opposition to the nomination of Earl Butz for United States Secretary of Agriculture.

In 1972, Hollings and Republican William Saxbe sponsored a resolution bestowing early United States recognition on Bangladesh as the Nixon administration sought a policy of delaying recognition until "there were commensurate diplomatic benefits to the United States."

In 1977, Hollings was one of five Democrats to vote against the nomination of F. Ray Marshall as United States Secretary of Labor.

In early 1979, United States Secretary of State Cyrus Vance sought permission from a Senate Appropriations subcommittee to transfer $2million in funds for the American Embassy to the new unofficial American Institute in Taiwan. Hollings was one of four members of the committee to oppose Vance's request during the latter's appearance before the subcommittee and Hollings later sent a letter to Vance declining the request. Hollings explained that "a smooth transition to unofficial relations may be threatened" in the event of funds not being transferred to the American Institute before the American Embassy in Taiwan ceased its function by its designated date of March 1. Hollings's opposition was considered unusual given that most requests were approved and State Department officials publicly stated their wishes for Hollings and his colleagues to drop their opposition in the face of Taiwan's reluctant agreement to setting up "nongovernmental body in Washington" that would serve as the counterpart to the American Institute in Taipei.

Hollings opposed legislation in 1979 that would admit additional ethnic Chinese refugees amid increased concern regarding moves by the Vietnamese government.

In August 1979, Hollings announced his opposition to the United States-Soviet Union nuclear arms treaty, saying the treaty should be defeated unless amended with a reduction of Soviet military power. His proposal was believed to stir Russian disapproval of the treaty if implemented. Hollings also made an unsuccessful attempt to persuade the Senate Budget Committee to add $2.6billion for a recommendation for military spending that would be included in Congress's second concurrent resolution on the budget.

Presidential candidate

Hollings unsuccessfully sought the Democratic nomination for President of the United States in the presidential election of 1984. Hollings's wit and experience, as well as his call for a budget freeze, won him some positive attention, but his relatively conservative record alienated liberal Democrats, and he was never really noticed in a field dominated by Walter Mondale, John Glenn and Gary Hart. Hollings dropped out two days after losing badly in the New Hampshire Primary, and endorsed Hart a week later. His disdain for his competitors sometimes showed. He notably referred to Mondale as a "lapdog" and to former astronaut Glenn as a "Sky King" who was "confused in his capsule".

Later Senate career

On March 24, 1981, Hollings introduced legislation that if passed would restore the military draft with limited deferments and exemptions and stipulating that men aged 18 to 22 years old would be required to spend nine months of active service for basic training that potentially would precede reserve duty. Hollings's proposal granted deferments "to people on active duty, in the reserves or in advanced Reserve Officers Training Corps study; surviving sons or brothers of those killed in war or missing in action; conscientious objectors and ministers; doctors and others in vital health professions, and judges of courts of record and elected officials". Hollings stated that recruiting for the armed forces had fallen short of requirements by an estimated 23,000 people in 1979 and that he believed the draft applying to women "should be across the board" due to the issue continuing to be debated between the public and the courts.

In 1981, Hollings apologized to fellow Democrat Howard Metzenbaum after Hollings referred to him as the "senator from B'nai B'rith" on the floor. Metzenbaum, who was Jewish, raised a point of personal privilege and Hollings's remarks were stricken from the record.

In March 1985, the Senate Budget Committee approved a proposal sponsored by Hollings freezing military spending by not allowing any growth above inflation in fiscal year 1986 and bestowing three percent hikes in the following two years, Hollings after the vote saying that a pattern had been set for similar action on other budget items and predicted that the Budget Committee would also go against another Reagan administration supported position by freezing Social Security cost of living increases.

On May 1, 1985, the Senate Committee on Commerce, Science and Transportation rejected an amendment to a bill reauthorizing the Federal Communications Commission prohibiting public television stations from swapping channels with commercial stations, Hollings afterward stating that the vote was "a tragic abdication by Congress of its over 60-year-old responsibility to protect the public's interest in broadcasting".

In October 1985, Hollings and Republicans Phil Gramm and Warren Rudman sponsored an amendment to establish a budget deficit ceiling that would decline to zero by 1991 that was attached to a bill raising the debt limit of the federal government by more than $250billion. The amendment was approved by a vote of 75 to 24 and was stated as a possible prelude to a balanced budget in five years without a tax increase by Secretary of the Treasury James Baker.

During the 1988 Presidential primaries, Hollings endorsed Jesse Jackson.

In October 1989, Hollings announced from his Washington office that he would request the General Accounting Office investigate efforts by the Federal Emergency Management Agency to provide timely assistance and funds to victims of Hurricane Hugo the previous month. Hollings charged FEMA with "stonewalling, fretting and filling out forms" and called on the federal government to become more active in trying to relieve areas devastated by Hurricane Hugo.

In April 1990, Hollings planned the compiling of the Senate Budget Committee to vote on a cut in Social Security taxes, an idea initially forwarded at the end of the previous year by fellow Democratic senator Daniel Patrick Moynihan as a way of making Congress address what he considered to be a serious problem in the management of the Social Security trust funds. Hollings sought a revenue figure which reflected the $36billion tax cut through a rollback of Social Security payroll taxes increases that were scheduled to take effect January1 and confirmed he would ask his colleagues on the budget committee to remove the trust funds from the budget deficit calculation and vote on the 1991 budget including a $300billion deficit. Hollings's plan included a five percent value-added tax on goods and services in addition to a ten percent oil import fee as well as an increase in the top income tax rate to thirty-three percent among wealthiest taxpayers. The goal was considered an uphill battle where Hollings could be outmaneuvered in committee with parliamentary tactics that would result in the precluding of a straight up-or-down vote on the Social Security tax cut. Acknowledging this, Hollings said, "They may try to block me. But we will find a bill by God to cut Social Security taxes. There will be a vote."

In January 1991, Hollings joined most Democratic senators in voting against a resolution authorizing war against Iraq.

In 1993, Hollings told reporters he attended international summits because, "Everybody likes to go to Geneva. I used to do it for the Law of the Sea conferences and you'd find those potentates from down in Africa, you know, rather than eating each other, they'd just come up and get a good square meal in Geneva." Hollings had previously caused controversy when responding to Yoshio Sakurauchi's commentary that Americans are lazy and illiterate. Hollings replied, "You should draw a mushroom cloud and put underneath it, 'Made in America by lazy and illiterate Americans and tested in Japan'."

Hollings remained very popular in South Carolina over the years, even as the state became increasingly friendly to Republicans at the national level. In his first three bids for a full term, he never dropped below sixty percent of the vote. In the 1992 election, however, he faced an unexpectedly close race against former Congressman Tommy Hartnett in what was otherwise a very good year for Democrats nationally. Hartnett had represented the Charleston area in Congress from 1981 to 1987, thus making him Hollings's congressman. His appeal in the Lowcountrytraditionally a swing region at the state levelenabled him to hold Hollings to only fifty percent of the vote.

In his last Senate race in 1998, Hollings faced Republican congressman Bob Inglis. One of the more heated moments of the race was a newspaper interview in which Hollings referred to Inglis as a "goddamn skunk". Hollings was re-elected 52%–45%.

On January 7, 2003, Hollings introduced the controversial Universal National Service Act of 2006, which would require all men and women aged 18–26 (with some exceptions) to perform a year of military service.

By 2003, Hollings realized that no Democrat could win statewide office in South Carolina's current political climate—not even as entrenched an incumbent as himself. On August 4, 2003, he announced that he would not run for re-election in November 2004. Republican Jim DeMint succeeded him.

In his later career, Hollings was moderate politically but was supportive of many civil rights bills. He voted for re-authorizing the Voting Rights Act in 1982. However, in 1967 he was one of the 11 senators who voted against the confirmation of Thurgood Marshall, the first black Supreme Court justice. Hollings later voted in favor of the failed nomination of Robert Bork and also for the successful nomination of Clarence Thomas.

On fiscal issues, he was generally conservative, and was one of the primary sponsors of the Gramm-Rudman-Hollings Act, an attempt to enforce limits on government spending.

Hollings and Howell Heflin of Alabama were the only two Democratic senators to vote against the Family and Medical Leave Act of 1993.

Entertainment industry 
As a senator, Hollings supported legislation in the interests of the established media distribution industry (such as the proposed "Consumer Broadband and Digital Television Promotion Act"). His hard-line support of various client-side computer restrictions such as DRM and Trusted Computing led the Fritz chip (Trusted Platform Module, a microchip that enforces such restrictions) to be nicknamed after him. Hollings introduced the SSSCA, a draft of the later CBDTPA, which would have mandated "manufacturers of all electronic devices and software to embed government approved copy protection technology in their products". Hollings also sponsored the Online Personal Privacy Act. According to OpenSecrets, between 1997 and 2002, Hollings received more than $300,000 from the entertainment industry.

Hollings was referred to as the "Senator from Disney" for his lobbying on behalf of the entertainment industry, including industry groups like the RIAA and MPAA.

Post Senatorial life and death

In retirement, Hollings wrote opinion editorials for newspapers in South Carolina and was a regular contributor to the Huffington Post. His opinion editorials were also published every week in EconomyInCrisis.org, an independent protectionist news blog. In 2008, the University of South Carolina Press published Making Government Work, a book authored by Hollings with Washington, D.C., journalist Kirk Victor, imparting Hollings's view on the changes needed in Washington. Among other things, the book recommended a dramatic decrease in the amount of campaign spending. It also attacked free trade policies as inherently destructive, suggesting that certain protectionist measures built the United States and that only a few parties actually benefited from free trade, such as large manufacturing corporations.

The Hollings Cancer Center at the Medical University of South Carolina, in Charleston, was established in 1993.

Hollings started the Hollings Scholarship in 2005. It gave more than a hundred undergraduates from around the country a ten-week internship with the National Oceanic and Atmospheric Administration and a monetary scholarship for the school year.

Hollings helped to establish the Hollings Center for International Dialogue, an organization which promotes dialogue between the United States and Turkey, the nations of the Middle East, North Africa, and Southwest Asia, and other countries with predominantly Muslim populations in order to open channels of communication, deepen cross-cultural understanding, expand people-to-people contacts, and generate new thinking on important international issues.

Hollings was also on the board of advisors as a distinguished visiting professor of Law with the Charleston School of Law. He delivered the commencement address to the first graduating class there on May 19, 2007.

On April 6, 2019, Hollings died at the age of 97 at his home in Isle of Palms, South Carolina, following a period of declining health. Former Vice President and future President Joe Biden delivered the eulogy at his funeral.

Electoral history

See also

Hollings Manufacturing Extension Partnership (MEP)
List of members of the American Legion

References

Sources

 Ballantyne, David T. New Politics in the Old South: Ernest F. Hollings in the Civil Rights Era (U of South Carolina Press, 2016). 206 pp
 Minchin, Timothy J., "An Uphill Fight: Ernest F. Hollings and the Struggle to Protect the South Carolina Textile Industry, 1959–2005", South Carolina Historical Magazine, 109 (July 2008), 187–211.

External links

 Ernest F. Hollings Papers at South Carolina Political Collections at the University of South Carolina
 "Fritz Hollings: In His Own Words", an online collection of documents from the Papers of Fritz Hollings at the University of SC
 
 https://www.nytimes.com/2004/12/19/weekinreview/19bigp.html?_r=1&oref=slogin
  OpenSecrets figures on Hollings's funding
 Salon article on the Online Personal Privacy Act
 LawMeme article about the Online Personal Privacy Act
 "Hollings's Harangue" NY Sun Article about the Howard Metzenbaum incident
 SCIway Biography of Ernest Frederick Hollings
 NGA Biography of Ernest Frederick Hollings

|-

|-

|-

|-

|-

|-

|-

|-

|-

American people of German descent
1922 births
2019 deaths
Democratic Party governors of South Carolina
Democratic Party United States senators from South Carolina
Democratic Party members of the South Carolina House of Representatives
Candidates in the 1984 United States presidential election
20th-century American politicians
21st-century American politicians
Politicians from Charleston, South Carolina
United States Army officers
United States Army personnel of World War II
Military personnel from Charleston, South Carolina
The Citadel, The Military College of South Carolina alumni
University of South Carolina alumni
University of South Carolina trustees
American Lutherans
Burials in South Carolina
20th-century Lutherans